Daniel Jorge Dias Esteves, commonly known as Danny Esteves, (born 29 July 1994) is a Portuguese footballer who plays as a forward for Fontinhas.

In his career Esteves also played for teams such as Academica Clinceni, União de Leiria, G.C. Alcobaça or S.C. Praiense.

References

External links

 
 
 Danny Esteves at lpf.ro

1994 births
Living people
People from Alcobaça, Portugal
Portuguese footballers
Association football forwards
Campeonato de Portugal (league) players
Liga I players
U.D. Leiria players
G.C. Alcobaça players
G.D. Vitória de Sernache players
A.C. Alcanenense players
S.C. Praiense players
LPS HD Clinceni players
C.D. Fátima players
Portuguese expatriate footballers
Portuguese expatriate sportspeople in Romania
Expatriate footballers in Romania
Sportspeople from Leiria District